Myrtle Point is a city in Coos County, Oregon, United States, established in 1887. The population was 2,514 at the 2010 census. Located in the Coquille River Valley, Myrtle Point is part of the Coos Bay/North Bend/Charleston Metropolitan Statistical Area, which consists of all of Coos County.

Geography

Oregon Route 42, which runs generally east−west from near Roseburg to near Coos Bay, passes through Myrtle Point. The South Fork Coquille River receives the east fork of the Coquille River just south of the city, and the combined stream receives the North Fork Coquille River just north of Myrtle Point.

Due to its proximity to the Pacific Ocean, the climate of the Coquille River Valley and Myrtle Point is considered mild and wet. Due to being further inland, summers are warmer and sunnier than in nearby Bandon or Coos Bay, but extremes are still rare. According to the Köppen climate classification, Myrtle Point has a warm-summer Mediterrean climate (Csb).

Demographics

2010 census
As of the census of 2010, there were 2,514 people, 1,027 households, and 677 families living in the city. The racial makeup of the city was 89.9% White, 0.4% African American, 3.5% Native American, 0.2% Asian, 0.1% Pacific Islander, 1.1% from other races, and 4.9% from two or more races. Hispanic or Latino of any race were 4.6% of the population.

There were 1,027 households, of which 30.8% had children under the age of 18 living with them, 47.5% were married couples living together, 13.3% had a female householder with no husband present, 5.1% had a male householder with no wife present, and 34.1% were non-families. 27.0% of all households were made up of individuals, and 13.4% had someone living alone who was 65 years of age or older. The average household size was 2.41 and the average family size was 2.89.

The median age in the city was 44.9 years. 23% of residents were under the age of 18; 6.6% were between the ages of 18 and 24; 20.3% were from 25 to 44; 28.2% were from 45 to 64; and 21.8% were 65 years of age or older. The gender makeup of the city was 48.2% male and 51.8% female.

2000 census
As of the census of 2000, there were 2,451 people, 988 households, and 674 families living in the city. The population density was 1,529.5 people per square mile (591.5/km). There were 1,110 housing units at an average density of 692.7 per square mile (267.9/km). The racial makeup of the city was 92.90% White, 0.29% African American, 2.77% Native American, 0.12% Asian, 0.04% Pacific Islander, 0.82% from other races, and 3.06% from two or more races. Hispanic or Latino of any race were 3.55% of the population. There were 988 households, out of which 30.3% had children under the age of 18 living with them, 50.9% were married couples living together, 12.9% had a female householder with no husband present, and 31.7% were non-families. 26.6% of all households were made up of individuals, and 14.5% had someone living alone who was 65 years of age or older. The average household size was 2.43 and the average family size was 2.89.

In the city, the population was 26.5% under the age of 18, 6.4% from 18 to 24, 23.4% from 25 to 44, 23.9% from 45 to 64, and 19.7% who were 65 years of age or older. The median age was 41 years. For every 100 females, there were 88.2 males. For every 100 females age 18 and over, there were 84.7 males. The median income for a household in the city was $27,536, and the median income for a family was $31,120. Males had a median income of $30,313 versus $20,476 for females. The per capita income for the city was $13,695. About 15.0% of families and 19.8% of the population were below the poverty line, including 24.2% of those under age 18 and 14.4% of those age 65 or over.

Museums and other attractions

The Coos County Fair is held yearly in Myrtle Point, near the campus of Myrtle Point High School. There is a Logging Museum in Myrtle Point. It has about a dozen beautifully carved scenes on 3’ x 5’ slabs of Myrtlewood. Outside it has a 20 foot tall logger to advertise the museum. The building is round with unusual acoustics- built as a Latter-day Saints church in early 1900s. It has notebooks filled with many pages of every man  killed in logging accidents in Coos County. It is open daily in summer months.

Infrastructure
Pacific Power - Electric
Ziply Fiber - High Speed Broadband, phone
DFN - Gigabit Fiber Internet, Phone, TV, and Managed IT Services
Charter Communications - Cable television, high speed Internet and digital phone service
City of Myrtle Point - Water and sewer

Government
Myrtle Point uses a city council consisting of seven elected members including the city mayor. The current mayor of Myrtle Point is Samantha Clayburn.

Notable people
Robert C. Belloni, Chief Judge for the United States District Court for the District of Oregon
Dennis Waterman, professional poker player and writer

See also
Steamboats of the Coquille River

References

External links
Listing for Myrtle Point in the Oregon Blue Book
Myrtle Point School District #41
City of Myrtle Point Official Homepage

Cities in Oregon
Cities in Coos County, Oregon
Port cities in Oregon
1887 establishments in Oregon
Populated places established in 1887